The 1989–90 Polska Liga Hokejowa season was the 55th season of the Polska Liga Hokejowa, the top level of ice hockey in Poland. 10 teams participated in the league, and Polonia Bytom won the championship.

Final round

Final round

Qualification round

Playoffs

Quarterfinals 
 Polonia Bytom - GKS Tychy 2:0 (6:3, 4:3)
 Zagłębie Sosnowiec - KS Cracovia 2:1 (5:1, 2:6, 6:3)
 Podhale Nowy Targ - Towimor Torun 2:0 (6:0, 5:3)
 Naprzód Janów - GKS Katowice 2:1 (1:3, 5:3, 6:3)

Semifinals 
 Polonia Bytom - Naprzód Janów 2:0 (10:2, 7:1)
 Podhale Nowy Targ - Zagłębie Sosnowiec 2:0 (3:2, 5:2)

Final 
 Polonia Bytom - Podhale Nowy Targ 3:0

Placing round

7th place
 Towimor Torun - GKS Tychy 6:3

5th place
 KS Cracovia - GKS Katowice 4:3

3rd place 
 Zagłębie Sosnowiec - Naprzód Janów 7:3

Relegation 
 Unia Oświęcim - Stoczniowiec Gdansk 2:0 (12:0, 7:2)

External links
 Season on hockeyarchives.info

1989-90
Pol
Liga